The 2012 WNBA season is the 15th season for the Washington Mystics of the Women's National Basketball Association.

Transactions

WNBA Draft
The following are the Mystics' selections in the 2012 WNBA Draft.

Transaction log
April 11, 2011: The Mystics traded a second-round pick in the 2012 Draft to the Atlanta Dream as part of the Lindsey Harding trade. The Mystics also received a first-round pick from Atlanta.
April 11, 2011: The Mystics traded a first-round pick in the 2012 Draft to the Minnesota Lynx in exchange for Nicky Ansoike.
April 29, 2011: The Mystics acquired a first-round pick in the 2012 Draft from the Seattle Storm and a third round-pick in the 2012 Draft from the Indiana Fever as part of the Katie Smith transaction.
February 1: The Mystics traded Marissa Coleman to the Los Angeles Sparks in exchange for Noelle Quinn.
February 9: The Mystics signed Michelle Snow.
February 14: The Mystics traded Victoria Dunlap to the Seattle Storm in exchange for Ashley Robinson.
February 15: The Mystics re-signed Kerri Gardin and signed Laura Harper and Ashley Walker.
February 16: The Mystics re-signed Crystal Langhorne.
February 21: The Mystics re-signed Monique Currie.
February 22: The Mystics signed Dominique Canty.
February 23: The Mystics traded Nicky Anosike to the Los Angeles Sparks in exchange for Natasha Lacy and LaToya Pringle.
March 7: The Mystics re-signed Matee Ajavon.
April 25: The Mystics signed draft picks LaSondra Barrett and Briana Gilbreath.
April 27: The Mystics signed Rashanda McCants.
April 28: The Mystics signed Tia Lewis, and draft picks Anjale Barrett and Natalie Novosel.
May 3: The Mystics waived Tia Lewis.
May 4: The Mystics waived Kerri Gardin.
May 9: The Mystics waived Briana Gilbreath.
May 14: The Mystics waived Laura Harper and Ashley Walker and signed Jessica Breland and Lindsay Wisdom-Hylton.
May 17: The Mystics waived Rashanda McCants, LaSondra Barrett, and Jessica Breland, and suspended LaToya Pringle.
June 13: The Mystics waived Dominique Canty and signed Shannon Bobbitt.
August 26: The Mystics waived Natasha Lacy and signed Izi Castro Marques.

Trades

Personnel changes

Additions

Subtractions

Roster

Depth

Season standings

Schedule

Preseason

|- align="center" bgcolor="ffbbbb"
| 1 || Thu 10 || 8:00 || @ Chicago ||  || 68-73 || Currie (12) || LanghorneSnow (7) || LacyQuinn (3) || New Trier High School  1,121 || 0-1
|- align="center" bgcolor="bbffbb"
| 2 || Mon 14 || 7:00 || Connecticut ||  || 83-64 || Currie (19) || Langhorne (13) || Lacy (6) || Verizon Center  5,142 || 1-1 
|-

Regular season

|- align="center" bgcolor="ffbbbb"
| 1 || Sat 19 || 7:00 || Chicago || CN100 || 57-69 || Langhorne (16) || Langhorne (8) || Quinn (5) || Verizon Center  11,415 || 0-1
|- align="center" bgcolor="bbffbb"
| 2 || Sat 26 || 7:00 || Tulsa ||  || 64-61 || Ajavon (19) || Langhorne (10) || AjavonLanghorne (3) || Verizon Center  11,866 || 1-1
|- align="center" bgcolor="ffbbbb"
| 3 || Wed 30 || 7:00 || Minnesota || CSN-MA || 77-79 || Ajavon (20) || Robinson (5) || Lacy (4) || Verizon Center  8,131 || 1-2
|-

|- align="center" bgcolor="ffbbbb"
| 4 || Fri 1 || 8:30 || @ Chicago || CN100 || 63-65 || Currie (15) || Snow (9) || AjavonLacy (4) || Allstate Arena  4,078 || 1-3
|- align="center" bgcolor="ffbbbb"
| 5 || Sun 3 || 3:00 || @ Connecticut || CPTV-S || 86-94 || Langhorne (25) || Currie (8) || AjavonCurrie (3) || Mohegan Sun Arena  7,065 || 1-4
|- align="center" bgcolor="ffbbbb"
| 6 || Fri 8 || 7:00 || New York || CSN-MA || 70-76 || Langhorne (24) || Snow (12) || AjavonQuinn (4) || Verizon Center  9,108 || 1-5
|- align="center" bgcolor="bbffbb"
| 7 || Fri 15 || 7:00 || Indiana || CSN-MA || 67-66 || Langhorne (22) || Langhorne (13) || Bobbitt (5) || Verizon Center  8,050 || 2-5
|- align="center" bgcolor="ffbbbb"
| 8 || Mon 18 || 10:30 || @ Los Angeles || TWC101 || 70-101 || Snow (15) || Snow (7) || Thomas (5) || Staples Center  8,612 || 2-6
|- align="center" bgcolor="ffbbbb"
| 9 || Wed 20 || 10:00 || @ Phoenix ||  || 77-80 || Snow (21) || Snow (9) || Ajavon (7) || US Airways Center  5,751 || 2-7
|- align="center" bgcolor="ffbbbb"
| 10 || Sun 24 || 7:00 || @ Seattle ||  || 55-72 || Langhorne (21) || LanghorneSnow (6) || Bobbitt (5) || KeyArena  6,979 || 2-8
|- align="center" bgcolor="ffbbbb"
| 11 || Tie 26 || 7:00 || Seattle || ESPN2 || 71-79 || Langhorne (20) || Langhorne (10) || Bobbitt (8) || Verizon Center  6,645 || 2-9
|- align="center" bgcolor="ffbbbb"
| 12 || Fri 29 || 7:00 || Connecticut || CSN-MACPTV-S || 64-77 || Currie (21) || Snow (9) || Bobbitt (7) || Verizon Center  6,975 || 2-10
|-

|- align="center" bgcolor="bbffbb"
| 13 || Sun 1 || 4:00 || Phoenix || CSN-MA || 90-77 || Langhorne (22) || Snow (9) || Bobbitt (5) || Verizon Center  10,789 || 3-10
|- align="center" bgcolor="ffbbbb"
| 14 || Fri 6 || 7:00 || San Antonio || NBATVCSN-MA || 73-78 || Currie (15) || Wisdom-Hylton (6) || Currie (6) || Verizon Center  6,522 || 3-11
|- align="center" bgcolor="ffbbbb"
| 15 || Sun 8 || 4:00 || @ Tulsa ||  || 62-78 || Langhorne (13) || Lacy (6) || AjavonThomas (4) || BOK Center  4,003 || 3-12
|- align="center" bgcolor="ffbbbb"
| 16 || Tue 10 || 11:30am || Connecticut || CSN-MACPTV-S || 70-77 || Langhorne (15) || Snow (11) || BobbittThomas (4) || Verizon Center  12,569 || 3-13
|- align="center" bgcolor="ffbbbb"
| 17 || Wed 11 || 7:00 || @ Connecticut ||  || 73-85 || Langhorne (19) || Snow (7) || Thomas (4) || Mohegan Sun Arena  7,804 || 3-14
|- align="center" bgcolor="bbffbb"
| 18 || Fri 13 || 11:00am || @ New York ||  || 70-53 || Langhorne (24) || Langhorne (6) || Ajavon (4) || Prudential Center  14,715 || 4-14
|-
| colspan="11" align="center" valign="middle" | Summer Olympic break
|-

|-
| colspan="11" align="center" valign="middle" | Summer Olympic break
|- align="center" bgcolor="ffbbbb"
| 19 || Thu 16 || 7:00 || @ Indiana || NBATV || 66-84 || Currie (12) || CurrieSnow (7) || Currie (3) || Bankers Life Fieldhouse  6,834 || 4-15
|- align="center" bgcolor="ffbbbb"
| 20 || Fri 17 || 8:00 || @ Minnesota || NBATV || 69-98 || CurrieLanghorneWisdom-Hylton (12) || Snow (9) || Novosel (4) || Target Center  10,933 || 4-16
|- align="center" bgcolor="bbffbb"
| 21 || Sun 19 || 4:00 || Chicago || NBATVCSN-MACN100 || 75-71(OT) || Ajavon (22) || Langhorne (8) || Thomas (8) || Verizon Center  8,489 || 5-16
|- align="center" bgcolor="ffbbbb"
| 22 || Tue 21 || 8:00 || @ San Antonio || NBATV || 72-75 || LanghorneThomas (17) || Langhorne (6) || 5 players (3) || AT&T Center  5,913 || 5-17
|- align="center" bgcolor="ffbbbb"
| 23 || Fri 24 || 7:00 || Atlanta || NBATVCSN-MA || 69-81 || Ajavon (20) || Langhorne (10) || BobbittNovosel (4) || Verizon Center  9,697 || 5-18
|- align="center" bgcolor="ffbbbb"
| 24 || Tue 28 || 7:00 || @ Indiana ||  || 68-83 || Quinn (13) || QuinnLanghorne (5) || Ajavon (4) || Bankers Life Fieldhouse  6,525 || 5-19
|- align="center" bgcolor="ffbbbb"
| 25 || Thu 30 || 7:00 || @ Atlanta || SSO || 59-82 || Currie (14) || LanghorneWisdom-Hylton (7) || LanghorneThomasBobbitt (3) || Philips Arena  3,381 || 5-20
|-

|- align="center" bgcolor="ffbbbb"
| 26 || Sat 1 || 4:00 || @ New York || NBATVMSG || 73-79 || Currie (20) || Langhorne (8) || Currie (4) || Prudential Center  6,245 || 5-21
|- align="center" bgcolor="ffbbbb"
| 27 || Tue 4 || 7:00 || Connecticut || CPTV-S || 70-77 || Langhorne (23) || Langhorne (9) || Thomas (5) || Verizon Center  5,980 || 5-22
|- align="center" bgcolor="ffbbbb"
| 28 || Fri 7 || 7:00 || Los Angeles || CSN-MA || 68-96 || Currie (16) || Snow (7) || Currie (3) || Verizon Center  7,468 || 5-23
|- align="center" bgcolor="ffbbbb"
| 29 || Sun 9 || 3:00 || @ Atlanta || SSO || 68-93 || LanghorneQuinn (12) || Robinson (13) || QuinnThomas (3) || Philips Arena  6,898 || 5-24
|- align="center" bgcolor="ffbbbb"
| 30 || Wed 12 || 7:00 || @ New York || MSG || 62-75 || Currie (24) || Langhorne (6) || Thomas (7) || Prudential Center  5,717 || 5-25
|- align="center" bgcolor="ffbbbb"
| 31 || Fri 14 || 7:00 || Atlanta ||  || 74-82 || Currie (20) || Robinson (7) || Ajavon (4) || Verizon Center  7,368 || 5-26
|- align="center" bgcolor="ffbbbb"
| 32 || Sun 16 || 4:00 || New York || NBATV || 68-75 || Thomas (16) || Robinson (10) || Robinson (3) || Verizon Center  8,087 || 5-27
|- align="center" bgcolor="ffbbbb"
| 33 || Fri 21 || 7:00 || Indiana || NBATV || 53-66 || Currie (16) || Robinson (7) || Wisdom-Hylton (4) || Verizon Center  7,702 || 5-28
|- align="center" bgcolor="ffbbbb"
| 34 || Sat 22 || 8:00 || @ Chicago || NBATVCN100 || 58-77 || Currie (15) || Robinson (7) || Currie (4) || Allstate Arena  6,721 || 5-29
|-

| All games are viewable on WNBA LiveAccess or ESPN3.com

Statistics

Regular season

Awards and honors

References

External links

Washington
Washington Mystics seasons
Washington Mystics